Swedish Evangelical Lutheran Church may refer to:

in the United States
(by state)
 Swedish Evangelical Lutheran Church of Ryssby, Boulder, CO, listed on the NRHP in Colorado
 Swedish Evangelical Lutheran Augustana Church, Sioux City, IA, listed on the NRHP in Iowa
 Swedish Evangelical Lutheran Church (Swedesburg, Iowa), listed on the NRHP in Iowa
 Swedish Evangelical Lutheran Church (Ham Lake, Minnesota), listed on the NRHP in Minnesota
 Swedish Evangelical Lutheran Church (Millville, Minnesota), listed on the NRHP in Minnesota
 Zion Swedish Evangelical Lutheran Church, Anaconda, MT, listed on the NRHP in Montana
 Swedish Evangelical Lutheran Salem Church, Wakefield, NE, listed on the NRHP in Nebraska
 Swedish Evangelical Mission Covenant Church, Portland, OR, listed on the NRHP in Oregon
 Bethsaida Swedish Evangelical Lutheran Church Parsonage, La Conner, WA, listed on the NRHP in Washington